Commodore-in-chief is an honorary appointment bestowed by the monarch of the Commonwealth realms on various members of the Royal Family. Previously, there have been honorary air commodores-in-chief in the British Royal Air Force and Royal Canadian Air Force, but no parallel affiliations with the navies of either country.

Commodore-in-Chief is an appointment rather than a rank. Holding an appointment of commodore-in-chief does not confer upon the holder the rank of commodore or indeed any other rank. Members of the Royal Family wear the uniform of their rank and are not issued with a different uniform for the appointment. However, Prince Edward, Duke of Edinburgh, who was appointed the Commodore-in-Chief of the Royal Fleet Auxiliary in 2006, has since appeared in the uniform of an RFA Commodore.

Canada
It was announced on 3 May 2015 that Charles, Prince of Wales, and Anne, Princess Royal, had been appointed by their mother, the Queen of Canada, as commodores-in-chief; Charles is Commodore-in-Chief (Fleet Atlantic) and Anne Commodore-in-Chief (Fleet Pacific). The appointment was timed to coincide with the 70th anniversary of the cessation of the Battle of the Atlantic.

United Kingdom

Admiral Sir Jonathon Band, First Sea Lord, said on news of the appointments: "They firmly underline the strength of the bond between the Royal Family and the Armed Forces, not least the Naval Service in which so many members of the Royal family have served with great distinction over the years."

Malaysia 
The Sultan of Selangor, currently Sharafuddin of Selangor, holds the dignity and appointment of Commodore-in-Chief of the Royal Malaysian Navy since 1984.

References

Royal Navy appointments
British monarchy
Honorary military appointments
Monarchy in Canada